Horace C. Spencer (July 1832 – November 1, 1926) was a Michigan politician.

Early life
In 1832, Spencer was born in Springville, Erie County, New York or possibly Coutland, New York. In 1853, he married Catherine Morris.  Traveling to Michigan in 1866, he entered the hardware business until 1880. In 1877, he invested his money as one of the original stockholders in the Second National Bank of Bay City, Michigan. With the Genesee County Savings Bank in 1885, he served as a director then later as a vice-president and a chairman of the board of directors. From 1891 to 1903, Spencer served as the first cashier of Citizens Commercial and Savings Bank.  He was also an initial member of the Board of Director.

Political life
Elected to the Michigan State Senate twice, Spencer served during Governor Alger's term and was a redistricting committee member.  He was elected as the mayor of the City of Flint in 1908 for a single 1-year term defeating the incumbent.  He serve several terms on the Flint City park board.

Post-political life
Horace C. Spencer died November 1, 1926 at his home in Flint, Michigan.

References

Mayors of Flint, Michigan
1832 births
1926 deaths
Republican Party Michigan state senators
19th-century American politicians
20th-century American politicians